The Florida Gators women's basketball team represents the University of Florida in the sport of basketball. The Gators compete in Division I of the National Collegiate Athletic Association (NCAA) and the Southeastern Conference (SEC).  The Gators play their home games at the O'Connell Center located on the university's Gainesville, Florida campus, and are currently led by head coach Kelly Rae Finley, following the resignation of Cameron Newbauer.  The Gators have appeared in 15 NCAA tournaments, with a record of 12-15.

History 

Women's basketball was approved as a sport by the University of Florida in March 1972, and began play in 1973 as a club team.  In 1975, the Gators debuted as a varsity program under head coach Paula Welch. They made local headlines in 1976 by winning the "state championship" by beating the other three women's teams in the state at that time.

While historically overshadowed by divisional (and national) basketball powers Tennessee and Georgia, the Gators have made several NCAA tournament appearances and sent players to the WNBA, such as DeLisha Milton-Jones. The winningest coach at Florida is Carol Ross, who guided the team for twelve seasons but left Florida to coach the women's basketball team at her alma mater, Ole Miss.

Florida's women's team was coached by Carolyn Peck, a former WNBA coach who won a national title with Purdue, from 2002 to 2007. Peck was fired midway through the 2006–2007 season (though she was allowed to finish out the season), after enduring the worst losing streak of any Gator sports program.

Former University of Florida player and previous Charlotte coach Amanda Butler was named the new women's basketball coach on April 13, 2007, and remained in that position until 2017.

On March 27, 2017, Cameron Newbauer was announced as the 10th head coach of the University of Florida women's basketball program.

2021 - 2022 Roster

Year by year results

Conference tournament winners noted with # Source

NCAA tournament results

Player awards

National awards
Wade Trophy
DeLisha Milton – 1997

SEC Awards
Player of the Year Award
DeLisha Milton – 1997

WNBA basketball players 

Florida has produced a number of players for the Women's National Basketball Association (WNBA).

Vanessa Hayden – Drafted with the 7th overall pick in the 2004 WNBA Draft by the Minnesota Lynx; currently playing with the Los Angeles Sparks
Tammy Jackson – Drafted with the 16th overall pick in the 1997 WNBA Draft; played five seasons with the Houston Comets where she won four straight WNBA Titles
Merlakia Jones – Drafted with the 13th overall pick in the second round of the 1997 WNBA Draft by the now defunct Cleveland Rockers; she played a total of 8 seasons in the WNBA
Brandi McCain – Drafted by the Cleveland Rockers with the 24th overall pick in 2002
DeLisha Milton-Jones – Drafted with the 4th overall pick in the 1999 WNBA Draft by the Los Angeles Sparks; she was traded to the Washington Mystics in 2004 and traded back to the Sparks in 2007
Murriel Page – Drafted by the Los Angeles Sparks with the 3rd overall pick in the 1998 WNBA Draft; played for the Sparks for 11 seasons
Bridget Pettis – Drafted with the 7th overall pick in the 1997 WNBA Elite Draft by the Phoenix Mercury; spent five seasons with the Mercury before being traded to the Indiana Fever, where she played two seasons, in 2002; she returned to the WNBA for one final season with Phoenix in 2006
Tamara Stocks – Drafted by the Washington Mystics with the 25th overall pick in the 2001 WNBA Draft
Tiffany Travis – Drafted with the 27th overall pick by the Charlotte Sting in the 2000 WNBA Draft
Sophia Witherspoon – Drafted with the 11th overall pick by the New York Liberty in the 1997 WNBA Draft; she played for the Liberty, the Fire, and the Sparks in her seven seasons in the league

See also 

 Florida Gators
 Florida Gators men's basketball
 History of the University of Florida
 List of Florida Gators in the WNBA
 List of University of Florida Athletic Hall of Fame members
 List of University of Florida Olympians
 University Athletic Association
 Women's basketball

References

External links 
 

 
Basketball teams established in 1974
1974 establishments in Florida